The Kon-Tiki Museum is a museum in the Bygdøy peninsula in Oslo, Norway. It houses vessels and maps from the Kon-Tiki expedition, as well as a library with about 8,000 books.
It was opened in a provisional building in 1949. In 1957, the current building—designed by architects F. S. Platou and Otto Torgersen—was opened. In 1978, an extension of the museum designed by Torgersen was opened.

The museum was originally built to house the Kon-Tiki, a raft of balsa wood of pre-Columbian model that Norwegian adventurer Thor Heyerdahl used to sail from Peru to Polynesia in 1947.  Another boat in the museum is the Ra II, a vessel built of reeds according to Heyerdahl's perception of an ancient Egyptian seagoing boat.  Heyerdahl sailed  the Ra II from North Africa to the Caribbean after a previous attempt with the reed boat Ra failed.

Beneath the raft is a model of the whale shark that the crew encountered on the voyage.

The Kon-Tiki Museum is situated near several other museums including the Fram Museum, the Norwegian Museum of Cultural History, the Viking Ship Museum and the Norwegian Maritime Museum.

References

External links 

Bygdøy
1949 establishments in Norway
Maritime museums in Norway
Museums established in 1949
Museums in Oslo
Thor Heyerdahl